Jordan Manihera (born 8 May 1993) is a New Zealand rugby union player who currently plays as a flanker for the San Diego Legion in the MLR.

Career

Manihera is a native of Auckland and came up through the ranks of his province , captaining their Under 20 side to the 2012 North Championship title.

Although not initially selected in either the  regular squad or wider training group for the 2014 Super Rugby season, an injury to young,  flanker Joe Edwards saw Manihera take his place. He was also later named in the Blues 27-man group for their 2 match tour of South Africa.

International

Manihera was a part of the New Zealand Under-20 squad which competed in the 2013 IRB Junior World Championship in France.

References

1993 births
Living people
Blues (Super Rugby) players
Expatriate rugby union players in the United States
New Zealand Māori rugby union players
New Zealand expatriate rugby union players
New Zealand expatriate sportspeople in the United States
North Harbour rugby union players
People educated at Westlake Boys High School
Rugby union flankers
Rugby union players from Auckland
San Diego Legion players
Waikato rugby union players